Thor is a genus of shrimp, containing the following species:

Thor algicola Wicksten, 1987
Thor amboinensis (De Man, 1888)
Thor cocoensis Wicksten & Vargas, 2001
Thor cordelli Wicksten, 1996
Thor dobkini Chace, 1972
Thor floridanus Kingsley, 1878
Thor intermedius Holthuis, 1947
Thor manningi Chace, 1972
Thor marguitae Bruce, 1978
Thor paschalis (Heller, 1862)
Thor spinipes Bruce, 1983
Thor spinosus Boone, 1935

References

Alpheoidea